Hawsh Sahiya  is a Syrian village located in Markaz Rif Dimashq District, Rif Dimashq. According to the Syria Central Bureau of Statistics (CBS), Hawsh Sahiya had a population of 5,355 in the 2004 census. To its North are Sbeineh, Al-Buwaydah, Hujayrah, and Sayyidah Zaynab.

References 

Populated places in Markaz Rif Dimashq District